= Clark's of Hove v Baker's Union =

1978 British labour law case

Clark’s of Hove v Bakers Union
- Court: Court of Appeal
- Citation: [1978] ICR 1076

Keywords
- Redundancy, consultation

Clark’s of Hove v Bakers Union [1978] ICR 1076 is a UK labour law case, concerning the duty to consult over redundancies.

== Facts ==
380 workers were made redundant, and they claimed there was a failure to consult. Clark’s of Hove claimed the ‘exceptional circumstance’ was that it ceased trading on 24 October 1976 after being in financial difficulty since the summer.

== Judgment ==
The Court of Appeal held that ‘insolvency is, on its own, neither here nor there’ and particularly where, as here, there was ‘a gradual run-down of the company’.

== See also ==
- UK labour law
